Teočak is a municipality located in Tuzla Canton of the Federation of Bosnia and Herzegovina, an entity of Bosnia and Herzegovina. The center of the municipality is the village of Teočak-Krstac.

Geography
The municipality borders the municipality of Lopare to the west, Ugljevik to the north and east, and Sapna to the south.
It is administratively part of the Tuzla Canton in the Federation of Bosnia and Herzegovina.

History

During the 1990s, due to the Bosnian war, the area of Teočak received several hundred Bosniak refugees from primarily the north and northeast areas of Teočak.

Before the war, Teočak was part of the Ugljevik municipality, and became itself a municipality as part of the Dayton Agreement.

Religion
The total number of mosques in the Teočak municipality is 7.

Demographics
According to the 2013 census, the municipality has a total of 7,424 inhabitants.

Population and ethnicity by settlement

Gallery

References

External links 

 Official website

Populated places in Teočak
Municipalities of the Tuzla Canton